Matt Lepay (born March 9, 1962) is an American sportscaster. Since 1988, Lepay has been the radio voice for the Wisconsin Badgers men's basketball team, and since 1994, the voice of the Wisconsin Badgers football team.

Early life
Lepay is a native of Vandalia, Ohio and graduated from Ohio State University.

Career

Radio
Lepay came to Madison, Wisconsin in 1988 and began calling games for the Wisconsin Badgers men's basketball team that same year. In 1994, following a brief period as sports director for WTSO Radio in Madison, he began working for WIBA handling Wisconsin Badgers football broadcasts as well. Lepay is currently employed by the university through their rights deal with the national college sports broadcasting outfit Learfield Sports.

Television
Lepay also hosts the weekly Badger Sports Report, an all-sport Badger athletics/coach's show which airs on Fox Sports Wisconsin and statewide on local stations, including WISC-TV.

Milwaukee Brewers
In January 2014, it was announced that Lepay would handle play-by-play for the Milwaukee Brewers television broadcasts on Fox Sports Wisconsin, as a substitute for Brian Anderson, while Anderson handled national assignments for Turner Sports, including NBA playoff coverage for TNT and baseball coverage for TBS. Lepay has continued to fill in for Anderson in each subsequent season, into 2021.

Awards and honors

Lepay is a seven-time winner of the Wisconsin Sportscaster of the Year Award.

in May 2012, Lepay was honored by The Madison Hall of Fame Club.

Personal

Lepay lives in Cross Plains, Wisconsin with his wife Linda.

References

1962 births
Living people
American sports announcers
College basketball announcers in the United States
College football announcers
Major League Baseball broadcasters
Milwaukee Brewers announcers
Ohio State University alumni
Sportspeople from Dayton, Ohio
Sportspeople from Madison, Wisconsin
Wisconsin Badgers football announcers
Wisconsin Badgers men's basketball
People from Vandalia, Ohio
People from Dane County, Wisconsin